Renan Demirkan (born 12 June 1955) is a German writer and actress. In 2016, she initiated the call "checkpoint:demokratie", which became a registered association in May 2017 and of which she is the chairman of the board. In June 2017, she founded the non-profit company "Zeit der Maulbeeren", of which she is the managing director. The project is supported by the state of NRW and is a free three-week offer to financially needy women with cancer, with or without children.

Filmography
1984: Super
1984: Don Carlos
1985: 
1988: Reporter
1989: Er – Sie – Es
1989: Quarantäne
1991: Forever Young
1992: Auge um Auge
1992: Der Augenzeuge
1992: 
1993: 
1995: Inzest – Ein Fall für Sina Teufel
1998: Reise in die Nacht
2005: Unter weißen Segeln

Publications 
Schwarzer Tee mit drei Stück Zucker. Roman, 1991.
Die Frau mit Bart. Erzählung, 1994.
Es wird Diamanten regnen vom Himmel. Roman, 1999.
Über Liebe, Götter und Rasenmähn. Geschichten, 2003.
Septembertee. Autobiographie, 2008.

Awards 
Demirkan has won numerous awards including the Goldene Kamera (1989), the Adolf Grimme Awards (1990), the Theaterpreis INTHEGA (2002) and the Bundesverdienstkreuz (1998).

References

External links
 
 Official website
 Renan Demirkan in: NRW Literatur im Netz 

1955 births
Turkish emigrants to Germany
German television actresses
Turkish television actresses
German women writers
Turkish writers
Living people
Recipients of the Cross of the Order of Merit of the Federal Republic of Germany
People from Ankara
Actresses from Ankara
20th-century German actresses
21st-century German actresses